Simon Business School (formerly known as the William E. Simon Graduate School of Business Administration) is the business school of the University of Rochester. It is located on the university's River Campus in Rochester, New York. It was renamed after William E. Simon (1927–2000), the 63rd United States Secretary of the Treasury, in 1986. The school's present dean is Sevin Yeltekin.

Simon Business School offers full-time, part-time, and executive (based in either Rochester or Switzerland) Master of Business Administration (MBA) programs, as well as Master of Science (MS) programs. The school is home to substantial academic research enterprises and a PhD program in several business disciplines.

History
The University of Rochester started as a small business program in 1958, and awarded its first MBA degree in 1962, but the School's impact in the business world can be traced to a later decision by then University President W. Allen Wallis to create a first-class business school in Rochester. In 1964, he was recruited as dean. Dean Wallis believed in the power of economics to solve a host of problems.

William H. Meckling—who would remain dean for 19 years—was a noted economist known for his analysis and leadership in support of an all-volunteer U.S. armed service. As dean, he committed the school to an economics-based approach to problem solving, recruited a faculty for researches at school, initiated new finance and accounting journals that incorporated economics, eliminated boundaries between functional departments, and transformed what had been a small, undergraduate and evening business school into a graduate business program.

As a result of work by Meckling and Michael C. Jensen—one of the faculty members he recruited—and other faculty members, the Simon became known for its contributions to the areas of finance, accounting, and organizational theory. The faculty's contributions, in turn, helped shape the research agenda of a generation of business scholars around the world, influencing teaching in graduate business programs and changing how many companies and executives in the US and abroad conduct business.

In 1986, another milestone in the school's history occurred when the school was renamed the William E. Simon Graduate School of Business Administration. William E. Simon, a financial entrepreneur and former U.S. Treasury Secretary, believed in the principles and ideals of the school. He offered his name and an enduring financial commitment to the school's continued success. He chaired the Executive Advisory Committee from its inception in 1986 until his death in June 2000.

Today, Sevin Yeltekin, who succeeded Andrew Ainslie in 2020, serves as dean of Simon Business School.

MBA programs

Full-time MBA program
The Full-Time Master of Business Administration (MBA) Program is the two-year in duration and begins in August. With an average full-time MBA enrollment of 100 students per class, the Full-time MBA The program consists of approximately 50 percent international students.

The Full-Time MBA degree requires 67 hours of study, consisting of a total of 20 classes (9 core required courses and 11 electives) and an additional 3-credit course on Business Communication and Career Success. Full-time students complete the MBA course requirements in six academic quarters of varying lengths with an internship in the summer between the first and second years of study.

The first year of the Full-Time MBA Program is divided into three quarters (Fall, Winter, and Spring), followed by a summer-long internship. During each of the first three quarters students are assigned to teams of four-to-five students. During the second year, which consists entirely of electives that allow students to focus on their preferred concentrations, students form their own teams.

Rankings 
The full-time MBA program is among the top 50 in the U.S., as rated by several prestigious publications. Simon is among the top 150 business schools in the world, according to Times Higher Education.

In 2021, Rochester (Simon) was ranked #25 by Bloomberg Businessweek.

Concentrations
Students in the MBA program have the opportunity to graduate with one or several concentrations. Some of the major areas of study include:
•	competitive and organizational strategy, including tracks in strategy and organizations and pricing
•	corporate accounting
•	entrepreneurship
•	finance
•	marketing, including tracks in marketing strategy, pricing, and brand management
•	business systems consulting
•	computers and information systems
•	health sciences management
•	international management
•	operations management
•	public accounting

Part-time MBA program
Simon's Part-Time Professional MBA Program offers the same educational opportunities and choices for a concentration as the Full-Time MBA Program, but through evening courses, tailored for individuals who are working while completing the degree. The program delivers a cohort-style experience for core courses, with assigned study teams, support services, and scholarships to support the accelerated timeline. The program begins each September (Fall) or March (Spring), with students taking two courses per quarter and completing the program in 2.5 academic years.

Executive MBA programs

Simon's Executive MBA program is offered on the Rochester campus, as well as in Bern, Switzerland, in conjunction with the Institut für Finanzmanagement at the Universität Bern.  The Bern program is equivalent to the Rochester program and is taught by Simon School faculty and European scholars.  Students are typically sponsored by their organizations and earn a University of Rochester degree.  Like Rochester's Executive MBA students, the students of the Rochester-Bern Executive MBA program in Switzerland come from a wide variety of countries and cultures. Bern students spend their four-week summer term in Rochester studying alongside American students.

MS programs
Simon Master of Science (MS) Programs generally only require one year of full-time study. Students also have the opportunity to take some classes with MBA candidates, work on multicultural teams, and participate in a variety of extracurricular activities. The school offers MS programs in accountancy, business analytics, finance, health care management, management, marketing analytics, and medical management.

The University of Rochester's Hajim School of Engineering and Applied Sciences also offers a Master of Technical Entrepreneurship and Management (T.E.A.M.) program, with some courses completed at Simon Business School.

MS in Health Care Management in New York City
The MS in Health Care Management curriculum is designed for working professionals who want to develop the skills to better evaluate their organizations, optimize care delivery, and prepare for the next round of fundamental industry change.
The program consists of six core courses from the Simon MBA curriculum and six health care courses covering key topics such as industry structure and reform, financing, insurance, operations, information technology, and investments. At the end of the program, a Medical Entrepreneurship Business Plan Project lets study teams apply their knowledge to a real-world situation selected by team members with faculty guidance. Typical projects include developing business plans for new or existing services, and identifying opportunities to improve clinical quality and efficiency.

The residency weeks—Orientation and FACt Workshop, and Special Topics in Finance, both held in Rochester, NY—offer students the opportunity to immerse themselves even more deeply into the subject matter. During residency weeks, students work closely with Simon professors, meet guest lecturers, and network with each other and Simon alumni to round out their graduate education.

Simon's Master of Science degree in New York City is a 13-month program that begins in July.

Simon Business School's NYC home is located at 185 W. Broadway in the Tribeca area of lower Manhattan. Simon's facility at New York Law School provides direct access to Wall Street, the city's civic center, and tech corridor. This is the only co-located law school and business school under one roof in New York City.

PhD program
Introduced in 1965, Simon Business School offers an extensive PhD program with a variety of concentrations.

The most common majors are Accounting, Finance, Marketing, Computer Information Systems, and Operations Management. Regardless of the major, all students' first-year studies include a core program designed to build a firm foundation of mathematics, statistics, and economics. While the majority of the courses are taken in common by all the incoming students, there is some specialization. This specialization gets more intense in the second year when the students concentrate on their major and minor fields of study.

A majority of Simon's PhD graduates attain academic positions in top business schools, with 20 percent getting their first job in a top-10 ranked business school.

Notable alumni and students
 Arunas A. Chesonis – chief executive officer (CEO) and chairman of the board, Sweetwater Energy; former chairman of the board and CEO, PAETEC Holding Corp.
 Tim Cost – president, Jacksonville University
 Gerry Gitner – former CEO, Trans World Airlines (TWA); co-founder and former president, People Express Airlines (PEOPLExpress); former senior executive, Pan American World Airways (Pan Am); former chairman and CEO, Pan Am World Services
 Pramit Jhaveri – CEO, Citibank India
 Robert E. Rich Jr. – chairman, Rich Products Corporation
 Dominic Seiterle – former Canadian Olympic rower and gold medalist

Academic contributions and research
Several innovations in business economics were developed by faculty at the school, including advances to agency theory and positive accounting theory. The school is also home to three  academic journals in management: the Journal of Accounting and Economics, the Journal of Financial Economics, and the Journal of Monetary Economics.

See also
List of United States business school rankings
List of business schools in the United States

References

External links

University of Rochester

Business schools in New York (state)
University of Rochester
Educational institutions established in 1958
1958 establishments in New York (state)